The office of the Moderator of the General Assembly was the highest elected position in the United Presbyterian Church of North America (UPCNA).  The Moderator was responsible for presiding over the meeting of the General Assembly, which was held annually between 1858 and 1958.  After the meeting, which lasted for about a week, the Moderator served as an ambassador of the denomination throughout the remainder of the term.  After completing the term, most former Moderators took on the role of a church statesman.

The chart below shows the Moderators, and the place of meetings, from 1858 when the PCUS was formed by the union of the Northern branch of the Associate Reformed Presbyterian Church with the Associate Presbyterian Church, until 1958 when the UPCNA merged with the Presbyterian Church in the United States of America to form the United Presbyterian Church in the United States of America.

Moderators of UPCNA General Assemblies

See also
List of Moderators of the General Assembly of the United Presbyterian Church in the United States of America
List of Moderators of the General Assembly of the Presbyterian Church (USA)
List of Moderators of the General Assembly of the Presbyterian Church in the United States

References

Presbyterian Church (USA)
American Christian clergy
Moderators